The 15th congressional district of Ohio is currently represented by Republican Mike Carey. It was represented by Republican Steve Stivers from 2011 until May 16, 2021, when he resigned to become president and CEO of the Ohio Chamber of Commerce. The district includes all of Franklin County that is not in the 3rd district, including Grove City, Hilliard, and Dublin.

Election results from presidential races

List of members representing the district 
{| class=wikitable style="text-align:center"

|- style="height:3em"
! Member
! Party
! Year(s)
! Congress
! Electoral history

|- style="height:3em"
| colspan=5 |District created March 4, 1833

|- style="height:3em"
| align=left | Jonathan Sloane
|  | Anti-Masonic
| nowrap | March 4, 1833 –March 3, 1837
| 
| Elected in 1832.Re-elected in 1834.Retired.

|- style="height:3em"
| align=left | John William Allen
|  | Whig
| nowrap | March 4, 1837 –March 3, 1841
| 
| Elected in 1836.Re-elected in 1838.Retired.

|- style="height:3em"
| align=left | Sherlock J. Andrews
|  | Whig
| nowrap | March 4, 1841 –March 3, 1843
| 
| Elected in 1840.Retired.

|- style="height:3em"
| align=left | Joseph Morris
|  | Democratic
| nowrap | March 4, 1843 –March 3, 1847
| 
| Elected in 1843.Re-elected in 1844.Retired.

|- style="height:3em"
| align=left | William Kennon Jr.
|  | Democratic
| nowrap | March 4, 1847 –March 3, 1849
| 
| Elected in 1846.Lost re-election.

|- style="height:3em"
| align=left | William F. Hunter
|  | Whig
| nowrap | March 4, 1849 –March 3, 1853
| 
| Elected in 1848.Re-elected in 1850.Retired.

|- style="height:3em"
| rowspan=2 align=left | William R. Sapp
|  | Whig
| nowrap | March 4, 1853 –March 3, 1855
| rowspan=2 | 
| rowspan=2 | Elected in 1852.Re-elected in 1854.Lost re-election.

|- style="height:3em"
|  | Opposition
| nowrap | March 4, 1855 –March 3, 1857

|- style="height:3em"
| align=left | Joseph Burns
|  | Democratic
| nowrap | March 4, 1857 –March 3, 1859
| 
| Elected in 1856.Lost re-election.

|- style="height:3em"
| align=left | William Helmick
|  | Republican
| nowrap | March 4, 1859 –March 3, 1861
| 
| Elected in 1858.Lost re-election.

|- style="height:3em"
| align=left | Robert H. Nugen
|  | Democratic
| nowrap | March 4, 1861 –March 3, 1863
| 
| Elected in 1860.Retired.

|- style="height:3em"
| align=left | James R. Morris
|  | Democratic
| nowrap | March 4, 1863 –March 3, 1865
| 

|- style="height:3em"
| align=left | Tobias A. Plants
|  | Republican
| nowrap | March 4, 1865 –March 3, 1869
| 
| Elected in 1864.Re-elected in 1866.Retired.

|- style="height:3em"
| align=left | Eliakim H. Moore
|  | Republican
| nowrap | March 4, 1869 –March 3, 1871
| 
| Elected in 1868.Retired.

|- style="height:3em"
| align=left | William P. Sprague
|  | Republican
| nowrap | March 4, 1871 –March 3, 1875
| 
| Elected in 1870.Re-elected in 1872.Retired.

|- style="height:3em"
| align=left | Nelson H. Van Vorhes
|  | Republican
| nowrap | March 4, 1875 –March 3, 1879
| 
| Elected in 1874.Re-elected in 1876.Retired.

|- style="height:3em"
| align=left | George W. Geddes
|  | Democratic
| nowrap | March 4, 1879 –March 3, 1881
| 

|- style="height:3em"
| align=left | Rufus Dawes
|  | Republican
| nowrap | March 4, 1881 –March 3, 1883
| 
| Elected in 1880.Lost re-election.

|- style="height:3em"
| align=left | Adoniram J. Warner
|  | Democratic
| nowrap | March 4, 1883 –March 3, 1885
| 

|- style="height:3em"
| align=left | Beriah Wilkins
|  | Democratic
| nowrap | March 4, 1885 –March 3, 1887
| 

|- style="height:3em"
| align=left | Charles H. Grosvenor
|  | Republican
| nowrap | March 4, 1887 –March 3, 1891
| 

|- style="height:3em"
| align=left | Michael D. Harter
|  | Democratic
| nowrap | March 4, 1891 –March 3, 1893
| 

|- style="height:3em"
| align=left | H. Clay Van Voorhis
|  | Republican
| nowrap | March 4, 1893 –March 3, 1905
| 
| Elected in 1892.Re-elected in 1894.Re-elected in 1896.Re-elected in 1898.Re-elected in 1900.Re-elected in 1902.Retired.

|- style="height:3em"
| align=left | Beman G. Dawes
|  | Republican
| nowrap | March 4, 1905 –March 3, 1909
| 
| Elected in 1904.Re-elected in 1906.Retired.

|- style="height:3em"
| align=left | James Joyce
|  | Republican
| nowrap | March 4, 1909 –March 3, 1911
| 
| Elected in 1908.Lost re-election.

|- style="height:3em"
| align=left | George White
|  | Democratic
| nowrap | March 4, 1911 –March 3, 1915
| 
| Elected in 1910.Re-elected in 1912.Lost re-election.

|- style="height:3em"
| align=left | William C. Mooney
|  | Republican
| nowrap | March 4, 1915 –March 3, 1917
| 
| Elected in 1914.Lost re-election.

|- style="height:3em"
| align=left | George White
|  | Democratic
| nowrap | March 4, 1917 –March 3, 1919
| 
| Elected in 1916.Lost re-election.

|- style="height:3em"
| align=left | C. Ellis Moore
|  | Republican
| nowrap | March 4, 1919 –March 3, 1933
| 
| Elected in 1918.Re-elected in 1920.Re-elected in 1922.Re-elected in 1924.Re-elected in 1926.Re-elected in 1928.Re-elected in 1930.Lost re-election.

|- style="height:3em"
| align=left | Robert T. Secrest
|  | Democratic
| nowrap | March 4, 1933 –August 3, 1942
| 
| Elected in 1932.Re-elected in 1934.Re-elected in 1936.Re-elected in 1938.Re-elected in 1940.Resigned to enter the U.S. Navy.

|- style="height:3em"
| colspan=2 | Vacant
| nowrap | August 3, 1942 –January 3, 1943
| 
|
|- style="height:3em"
| align=left | Percy W. Griffiths
|  | Republican
| nowrap | January 3, 1943 –January 3, 1949
| 
| Elected in 1942.Re-elected in 1944.Re-elected in 1946.Lost re-election.

|- style="height:3em"
| align=left | Robert T. Secrest
|  | Democratic
| nowrap | January 3, 1949 –September 26, 1954
| 
| Elected in 1948.Re-elected in 1950.Re-elected in 1952.Resigned to become a member ofthe Federal Trade Commission.

|- style="height:3em"
| colspan=2 | Vacant
| nowrap | September 26, 1954 –January 3, 1955
| 
|
|- style="height:3em"
| align=left | John E. Henderson
|  | Republican
| nowrap | January 3, 1955 –January 3, 1961
| 
| Elected in 1954.Re-elected in 1956.Re-elected in 1958.Retired.

|- style="height:3em"
| align=left | Tom V. Moorehead
|  | Republican
| nowrap | January 3, 1961 –January 3, 1963
| 
| Elected in 1960.Lost re-election.

|- style="height:3em"
| align=left | Robert T. Secrest
|  | Democratic
| nowrap | January 3, 1963 –December 30, 1966
| 
| Elected in 1962.Re-elected in 1964.Resigned.

|- style="height:3em"
| colspan=2 | Vacant
| nowrap | December 30, 1966 –January 3, 1967
| 
|
|- style="height:3em"
| align=left | Chalmers P. Wylie
|  | Republican
| nowrap | January 3, 1967 –January 3, 1993
| 
| Elected in 1966.Re-elected in 1968.Re-elected in 1970.Re-elected in 1972.Re-elected in 1974.Re-elected in 1976.Re-elected in 1978.Re-elected in 1980.Re-elected in 1982.Re-elected in 1984.Re-elected in 1986.Re-elected in 1988.Re-elected in 1990.Retired.

|- style="height:3em"
| align=left | Deborah Pryce
|  | Republican
| nowrap | January 3, 1993 –January 3, 2009
| 
| Elected in 1992.Re-elected in 1994.Re-elected in 1996.Re-elected in 1998.Re-elected in 2000.Re-elected in 2002.Re-elected in 2004.Re-elected in 2006.Retired.

|- style="height:3em"
| align=left | Mary Jo Kilroy
|  | Democratic
| nowrap | January 3, 2009 –January 3, 2011
| 
| Elected in 2008.Lost re-election.

|- style="height:3em"
| align=left | Steve Stivers
|  | Republican
| nowrap | January 3, 2011 –May 16, 2021
| 
| Elected in 2010.Re-elected in 2012.Re-elected in 2014.Re-elected in 2016.Re-elected in 2018.Re-elected in 2020.Resigned to become CEO of the Ohio Chamber of Commerce.

|- style="height:3em"
| colspan=2 | Vacant
| nowrap | May 16, 2021 –November 4, 2021
| rowspan=1 | 
|
|- style="height:3em"
| align=left | Mike Carey
|  | Republican
| nowrap | November 4, 2021 –Present
| 
| Elected to finish Stivers's term.Re-elected in 2022.

|}

Election results
The following chart shows historic election results. Bold type' indicates victor. Italic type indicates incumbent.

Historical district boundaries

In popular culture
The character Deanna Monroe, from AMC's The Walking Dead'' was a former Congresswoman from Ohio's 15th congressional district.

See also
Ohio's congressional districts
List of United States congressional districts

References

Sources

 Congressional Biographical Directory of the United States 1774–present

15
Constituencies established in 1833
1833 establishments in Ohio